Dong Re Lao Mountain is located at  in the A Shau Valley, Vietnam, near the Laotian border.

In April 1968, during the Vietnam War, the mountain was the site of an intense battle between members of the American 1st Cavalry Division, long-range reconnaissance patrol troops, and the North Vietnamese Army. The mountain was dubbed "Signal Hill" by headquarters as it served as the lone radio relay site for American forces fighting in the valley during Operation Delaware.

See also
Battle of A Shau
Battle of Signal Hill Vietnam
Company E, 52nd Infantry (LRP)
Long Range Reconnaissance Patrol
Operation Delaware

References

1968 in Vietnam
Conflicts in 1968
Delaware
Delaware
Delaware
Landforms of Thừa Thiên Huế province
History of Thừa Thiên Huế province
Vietnam War sites
Mountains of Vietnam